Hempstead is a village located in the Town of Hempstead in Nassau County, on Long Island, in New York, United States. The population was 59,169 at the 2020 census making it the most populous village in New York. 

The Incorporated Village of Hempstead is the site of the seventeenth-century "town spot" from which English and Dutch settlers developed the Town of Hempstead, the Town of North Hempstead, and ultimately Nassau County. It is the largest community by population in both the Town of Hempstead and Nassau County.

Hofstra University is partially located in Hempstead.

Etymology 
Hempstead may have been named after Hemel Hempstead in the English county of Hertfordshire, where village founder John Carman was born. Another theory regarding the origin of the village's name is that it is derived from the town of Heemstede in the Netherlands, as this was an area from which many Dutch settlers of New Netherland originated.

In 1664, the new settlement adopted the Duke's Laws, an austere set of laws that became the basis upon which the laws of many colonies were to be founded. For a time, Hempstead became known as "Old Blue," as a result of the blue laws.

History

Foundation

The land on which the Village of Hempstead stands was under Dutch control from the early 1620s. In the fall of 1643, two followers of the Presbyterian minister Richard Denton, Robert Fordham and John Carman, crossed Long Island Sound by rowboat to negotiate with the local Native Americans for a tract of land upon which to establish a new community. Representatives of the Marsapeague (Massapequa), Mericock (Merrick), Matinecock and Rekowake (Rockaway) tribes met with the two men at a site slightly west of the current Denton Green in Hempstead Village. Tackapousha, who was the sachem (chief spokesman) of the Marsapeague, was the acknowledged spokesman for conducting the transaction. The Indians sold approximately 64,000 acres (260 km2), the present day towns of Hempstead and North Hempstead, for an unknown quantity of items; a 1657 revisit of this agreement names large and small cattle, stockings, wampum, hatchets, knives, trading cloth, powder, and lead given as payment by the English. Some items may have been valuable to the Native Americans in terms of the contemporary markets for European "trinkets," which may have held symbolic and spiritual importance to Native America peoples in the Northeast.

In the spring of 1644, thirty to forty families left Stamford, Connecticut, crossed Long Island Sound, landed in Hempstead Harbor and eventually made their way to the present site of the village of Hempstead where they began their English settlement within Dutch-controlled New Netherland. The settling of Hempstead marked the beginnings of the oldest English settlement in what is now Nassau County. Subsequent trips across the Sound brought more settlers who prepared a fort here for their mutual protection. These original Hempstead settlers were Puritans in search of a place where they could more freely express their particular brand of Protestantism. They established a Presbyterian church that is the oldest continually active Presbyterian congregation in the nation. In 1843, Benjamin F. Thompson wrote and published a history of the village, and an account of contemporary Hempstead Village. Thompson reported that there were 200 dwellings, and 1,400 residents; that the village was connected to New York City by a turnpike and a railroad; that it had dry soil, excellent water, and pure air; and that it was the principal place of mercantile, and mechanical business, in the county. The village of Hempstead was incorporated on May 6, 1853, becoming the first community in Queens County (Nassau County did not exist as a separate county until 1899) to do so.

Rise

As the years passed, the population of Hempstead increased, as did its importance and prestige. Between 1703 and 1705, the newly formed St. George's Church received a silver communion service from England's Queen Anne.

During the American Revolution, Hempstead was a center of British sympathizers.  The British attempted to occupy Hempstead after the Battle of Long Island, and used St. George's as a headquarters as well as a place to worship. Judge Thomas Jones faulted a lax peace treaty for forcing the evacuation of the loyalists.

In the 19th century, Hempstead became increasingly important as a trading center for Long Island. In 1853 it became the first self-governing incorporated village. Many prominent families such as the Vanderbilts and the Belmonts built homes here, making Hempstead a center of Long Island society. Hempstead merchants established routes out to outlying farms and served as a distribution point for many firms. Wagons would leave Hempstead loaded with tobacco, candy, and cigarettes and return in a week to restock. Bakeries covered routes from Baldwin to Far Rockaway daily. Butchers ran routes to Seaford, Elmont, Valley Stream, Wantagh, East Meadow, Creedmoor, East Rockaway and Christian Hook. Drugs, medicines, perfumes, extracts, aprons, children's coats and dresses and men's clothes were peddled about the country by Hempstead merchants. People came from all sections of Queens to purchase stoves, and there were few places outside Hempstead where stoves could be purchased. Hempstead was the shopping center for Nassau County and the eastern portion of Queens, those settlements east of Jamaica before 1900 when Nassau County was established, following the creation of the City of Greater New York in 1898. Hempstead has historically been the center of commercial activity for the eastern counties of Long Island. In Nassau County, all major county roads emanate from this village. During the 18th and 19th centuries, all stage coaches en route to eastern Long Island from Brooklyn passed through Hempstead. Today, seventeen bus routes and three interstate buses leave from the village every day. In addition, the Hempstead Branch of the Long Island Rail Road has its terminal here. At one time, there were three railroad companies with terminals within the village.

In March 1898, Camp Black was formed on the Hempstead Plains (roughly the shared location of Hempstead and Garden City), in support of the impending Spanish–American War. Camp Black was bounded on the north by Old Country Road, on the west by Clinton Road, and on the south by the Central Line rail. Camp Black was opened on April 29, 1898 as a training facility and a point of embarkation for troops.

Early Long Islanders made their living in agriculture or from the sea. Hempstead, with its central location, became the marketplace for the outlying rural farming communities. It was a natural progression, as the surrounding areas developed from small farms into today's suburbia, that Hempstead Village would remain as the marketplace. Chain department stores such as Arnold Constable and Abraham & Straus called Hempstead home for many years. Hempstead's Abraham & Straus was the largest grossing suburban department store in the country during the late 1960s. Hempstead was Nassau's retail center during the 1940s through the 1960s. The advent of regional shopping malls such as the one at nearby Roosevelt Field, the demise of nearby Mitchel Air Force Base in 1961 as well as the changing demographics put the retail trade in the village into a downward spiral that it was unable to recover from during the recessions of the 1970s and 1980s. A plethora of businesses left the village in the 1980s and early 1990s, including Abraham & Straus.

Recent years

In the course of the 1990s the village saw redevelopment as a government center as well as business center. There are more government employees from all levels of government in the village than there are in Mineola, the county seat. According to James York, the municipal historian, writing in 1998, the population during the day might rise to nearly 200,000, from a normal census of 50,000. Retailers' interest in the village was rekindled, due to the aggressive revitalization efforts of former Mayor James Garner, who served from 1989 to 2005, and former Community Development Agency Commissioner, Glen Spiritis, who served under Garner's administration. Specifically, two large tracts of retail property have recently undergone redevelopment. The former  Times Squares Stores (or TSS) property on Peninsula Boulevard and Franklin Street has been redeveloped as Hempstead Village Commons, a  retail center including Pep Boys and Staples. The former Abraham & Straus department store on  has recently undergone demolition and been replaced by a large retail development consisting of Home Depot, Old Navy, Stop & Shop and many other smaller establishments. A considerable infusion of state and federal funding as well as private investment have enabled the replacement of blighted storefronts, complete commercial building rehabilitations and the development of affordable housing for the local population. The replacement of the 1913 Long Island Rail Road Hempstead Terminal with a modern facility was completed in 2002, and a four-story, 112-unit building for senior housing, with retail on the ground level was completed at Main and West Columbia Streets in January 1998. Thirty two units of affordable townhouses known as Patterson Mews at Henry Street and Baldwin Road was completed and fully occupied in 1997.

In 1989, Hempstead residents elected James A. Garner as their mayor. He was the first Black or African-American mayor ever elected to office on Long Island, and he served for four consecutive terms. Subsequently, Wayne Hall, a former Village of Hempstead trustee who is also African American, served as mayor for three terms, from 2005 to 2017.

The first African-American male judge, Lance Clarke, was elected in 2001. Cynthia Diaz-Wilson was the first female justice in the Village of Hempstead and first African American village justice in the state of New York.

In recent years, there has been concern regarding ongoing gang activity in certain neighborhoods, notably the "Heights", in addition to the issue of illegal rentals (homes/apartments that are illegally-subdivided by slumlords) and racial steering. Hempstead was also one of the first Long Island communities that had to deal with the Salvadoran gang, MS-13 or "La Mara Salvatrucha". The continual intra-violence this gang has exhibited has led to the formation of their arch-rivals, "SWP" or "Salvadorans with Pride". These issues have contributed to Hempstead's high crime rate as compared to other communities in the area. 

A 2019 investigation by Newsday revealed widespread racial discrimination by real estate agents on Long Island, including in Hempstead.

Geography

According to the United States Census Bureau, the village has a total area of 3.7 square miles (9.5 km2), all land. The Village of Hempstead differs from the majority of Nassau County as its population density is about 15,000 people per square mile—almost four times that of its neighbor on its northern border, Garden City.

Demographics

As of the census of 2010, there were 53,891 people, 15,234 households, and 10,945 families residing in the village. The racial makeup of the village was 21.9% White, 44.2% Hispanic, 48.3% Black or African American, 0.6% Native American, 1.4% Asian, 0.0% Pacific Islander, 22.8% from other races, and 5.0% from two or more races.

There were 16,034 households, out of which 38.7% had children under the age of 18 living with them, 39.0% were married couples living together, 27.0% had a female householder with no husband present, and 26.4% were non-families. 20.8% of all households were made up of individuals, and 6.7% had someone living alone who was 65 years of age or older. The average household size was 3.41 and the average family size was 3.76.

In the village, the population was spread out, with 26.2% under the age of 18, 16.3% from 18 to 24, 31.4% from 25 to 44, 17.5% from 45 to 64, and 8.5% who were 65 years of age or older. The median age was 29 years. For every 100 females, there were 91.6 males. For every 100 females age 18 and over, there were 86.4 males.

The median income for a household in the village was $45,234 and the median income for a family was $46,675. Males had a median income of $29,493 versus $27,507 for females. The per capita income for the village was $15,735. About 14.4% of families and 17.7% of the population were below the poverty line, including 20.7% of those under age 18 and 16.9% of those age 65 or over.

Government
As of August 2022, the Mayor of Hempstead is Waylyn Hobbs, Jr, the Deputy Mayor is Jeffery Daniels, and the Village Trustees are Kevin Boone, Noah Burroughs, Jeffery Daniels, and Clariona D. Griffith.

In the 2020 U.S. presidential election, the majority of Hempstead voters voted for Joseph Biden (D).

Education

Primary and secondary education 
The community is served by the Hempstead Union Free School District. Students attend Alverta B. Gray-Schultz Middle School and Hempstead High School for their secondary years of K-12 education. 

There is one private high school in Hempstead: Sacred Heart Academy, a private all-girls Catholic school.

There is one charter school located within the village: the Academy Charter School of Hempstead.

Higher education 
Hofstra University's campus is partially located within the Village of Hempstead, and is split between the village and its unincorporated neighbor, Uniondale.

Transportation
The Rosa Parks Hempstead Transit Center is one of the largest hubs in Nassau County. It serves as the terminus of the Long Island Rail Road's Hempstead Branch, and is served by a number of Nassau Inter-County Express routes.

Points of interest 

Hofstra University
Hofstra University Arboretum
Hempstead Bus Terminal
Nassau County African American Museum
St. George's Episcopal Church
 Christ's First Presbyterian Church – First Presbyterian church established in the US

Notable people
Residents (native or lived) about whom an article exists, by date of birth:

 Samuel L. Mitchill (1764–1831), physician, naturalist, and politic; born in Hempstead
 Walt Whitman (1819–1892; resident 1836–1838), poet, essayist, journalist, and humanist
 William S. Hofstra (1861–1932), entrepreneur
 Christopher Morley (1890–1957; resident during the 1910s), journalist, novelist, essayist, and poet
 Frank Field (b. 1923), television meteorologist
John Mackey (1941–2011), NFL player
 Walter Hudson (1944–1991; life resident), 4th most obese human, Guinness World Record for the largest waist
 Julius Erving (born 1950), basketball star, lived in the village of Hempstead as a child for at least two or three years from around 1953 to 1955 or 1956
 Sheryl Lee Ralph (born 1956), actress and singer
 Eric "Vietnam" Sadler (born 1960; native 1960-87, music producer, Public Enemy, Ice Cube, Slick Rick, Bell Biv Devoe, Vanessa Williams)
 Rob Moore (born 1968; native), NFL football player
 Method Man (born 1971), rapper, songwriter, record producer, and actor; spent his childhood living between Hempstead and Staten Island
 Trevor Tahim "Busta Rhymes" Smith, Jr. (born 1972), resident, rapper, producer, and actor
 Prodigy (1974–2017; native), member of hip-hop duo Mobb Deep
 Craig "Speedy" Claxton (born 1978; native), NBA basketball player
 Tavorris Bell (born 1978), Harlem Globetrotter
 Scott Lipsky (born 1981), tennis player
Hykiem Coney (1982–2006), anti-gang activist
 A+ (born 1982; native and childhood), rapper, made albums in 1996 and 1999 during his school years
Roc Marciano (born 1978), rapper and producer
 Tu Holloway (born 1989), basketball player for Maccabi Rishon LeZion in the Israeli Basketball Premier League.

See also
Suburban Technical School

References

External links
 Official website
 Village Code

 
Villages in New York (state)
New Netherland
Villages in Nassau County, New York
1643 establishments in the Dutch Empire